Arjan Human (Middelharnis, 8 November 1978) is a former Dutch professional association football player.

Football career
Human played for Cercle Brugge. Next he was a forward for the Dutch professional teams RKC Waalwijk (2000–2001) and ADO Den Haag (2001–02).

He then played in the Saturday Hoofdklasse for VV Kloetinge, HSV Hoek and ASWH. With ASWH he took the 2005 national championship for amateurs and in 2006 the KNVB Cup and the Supercup for amateurs.

At the start of 2007, he was tested by the Chinese teams Tianjin TEDA F.C. and Qingdao Haixin. In Augustus 2007, during a KNVB Cup game against WKE, Human suffered a major injury.

Only in January 2009, he returned to play football. In July 2009 he changed sides for BVV Barendrecht. In May 2010 they won the championship of Hoofdklasse A. In the summer of 2011, he started playing in VC Vlissingen.

Next Human managed VV Breskens. Upon disappointing results, Human returned to play in January 2016 for MZVC from Middelburg.

References

1978 births
Dutch footballers
ASWH players
ADO Den Haag players
RKC Waalwijk players
HSV Hoek players
VC Vlissingen players
Cercle Brugge K.S.V. players
Living people
Association footballers not categorized by position
VV Kloetinge players
People from Middelharnis
Footballers from South Holland